Boris Anatolyevich Mosolov (born 20 May 1948) is a Soviet modern pentathlete, born in Moscow. He competed at the 1976 Summer Olympics.

References

External links
 

1948 births
Living people
Soviet male modern pentathletes
Olympic modern pentathletes of the Soviet Union
Modern pentathletes at the 1976 Summer Olympics
Sportspeople from Moscow